Johanna Klier ( Schaller, also known as Schaller-Klier, born 13 September 1952) is a former East German hurdler and Olympic gold medallist.

Under her maiden name, she won the gold medal at the 1976 Summer Olympics in the 100 m hurdles. Under her married name, she won the silver medal 1980 Summer Olympics in Moscow, again in the 100 m hurdles.

In 1976–78, and 1980 she was East German champion, also winning indoors in 1978 in the 60 hurdles. At the 1977 World Cup Schaller was runner-up, but she won gold at the 1978 European Championships in the high hurdles, adding a bronze with the sprint relay. She also won the 1977 European Cup and the 1978 European Indoors over 60 hurdles.

She married the hurdler Martin Klier on 11 September 1976. Schaller-Klier was educated as a sports teacher and worked at the Pedagogical University of Erfurt / Mulhousen. After German reunification she moved to Landessportbund, Thuringia and worked in the youth department.

International competitions

See also
List of Olympic medalists in athletics (women)
List of 1976 Summer Olympics medal winners
List of European Athletics Championships medalists (women)
List of European Athletics Indoor Championships medalists (women)
Sprint hurdles at the Olympics
Women's 4 × 100 metres relay world record progression

References

External links 

 
 

1952 births
Living people
People from Artern
People from Bezirk Halle
Socialist Unity Party of Germany members
East German female hurdlers
Sportspeople from Thuringia
Olympic athletes of East Germany
Athletes (track and field) at the 1976 Summer Olympics
Athletes (track and field) at the 1980 Summer Olympics
Olympic gold medalists for East Germany
Olympic silver medalists for East Germany
Olympic gold medalists in athletics (track and field)
Olympic silver medalists in athletics (track and field)
Medalists at the 1976 Summer Olympics
Medalists at the 1980 Summer Olympics
European Athletics Championships medalists
Recipients of the Patriotic Order of Merit in silver